Classified is the second Sweetbox album and the first album to feature Jade Villalon as the frontwoman and songwriter. Released in 2001, the album was made in three different editions. Sounds on the album include pop, dance and rock, with all of the songs based on various classical pieces, many borrowed from famous film themes. With Jade Villalon's songwriting style, this album saw Sweetbox's sound change from the R&B influences of its past. Three additional songs were written for the album; "In the Corner" and "Heartbreaker", which were released on two Sweetbox demo compilations, and "Happy Tears", which was released on Jade's final album under Sweetbox, Addicted.

Track listing

Credits
Conductor – Mario Klemens
Engineer [Additional Sound] – Mila Jilek
Producer, Recorded By, Mixed By – Geo Rosan
Executive Producer – Heiko Schmidt
Score [Strings] – Boris Jojic

Samples
 "Boyfriend" samples "Gonna Fly Now", the Rocky theme song, by Bill Conti
 "Brown Haired Boy" samples Beethoven's "Fur Elise"
 "Cinderella" samples Telemann's "Trumpet Concerto"
 "Crazy" samples Beethoven's "5th Symphony"
 "Everything's Gonna Be Alright" samples Bach's "Air on a G String (Suite No.3)"
 "For The Lonely" samples the theme from La califfa, by Ennio Morricone
 "Not Different (I Laugh I Cry)" samples Handel's "Largo from Xerxes"
 "Superstar" samples Tchaikovsky's "Scene from Swan Lake"
 "That Night" samples Leonardo di Gioforte's "Concerto For Oboe in D Major"
 "Trying To Be Me" samples Grieg's "Solveig's Song"

Certifications

References

2001 albums
Sweetbox albums